= Red Dwarf – The Roleplaying Game =

Role-playing game

Red Dwarf – The Roleplaying Game is a 2002 role-playing game published by Deep7.

== Gameplay ==
Red Dwarf – The Roleplaying Game is a game in which the BBC sci-fi comedy universe is expanded with quirky playable species, bizarre gadgets, and the infamous Mutton Vindaloo Beast.

== Publication history ==
Deep7 Press (formerly Deep7 LLC) released Red Dwarf – The Roleplaying Game in February 2003 (the printed copyright is 2002). Based on the series, the game allows its players to portray original characters within the Red Dwarf universe. Player characters can be human survivors, holograms, "evolved" house pets (cats, dogs, iguanas, rabbits, rats and mice), various types of mechanoid (Series 4000, Hudzen 10 and Waxdroids in the corebook, Series 3000 in the Extra Bits Book) or GELFs (Kinatawowi and Pleasure GELF in the corebook, "Vindaloovians" in the Extra Bits Book).

A total of three products were released for the game: the core 176-page rulebook, the AI Screen (analogous to the Game Master's Screen used in other role-playing games, also featuring the "Extra Bits Book" booklet) and the Series Sourcebook. The Series Sourcebook contains plot summaries of each episode from series I to VIII as well as game rules for all major and minor characters from each series.

== Reception ==
The game has been praised for staying true to the comedic nature of the TV show, for its entertaining writing and for the detail to which the background material is explained. However, some reviewers found the game mechanics to be simplistic and uninspiring compared to other science-fiction role-playing games on the market.

== Reviews ==
- Pyramid
